Two ships in the United States Navy have been named USS Hammann for Ensign Charles Hammann.

, was a destroyer, commissioned in 1939 and sunk in enemy action in 1942
, was a destroyer escort, commissioned in 1942 and decommissioned in 1946

United States Navy ship names